Joselia Aguiar is a Brazilian writer. She was born in Salvador, Bahia in 1978. She has a PhD in history from the Universidade de São Paulo. She worked at Folha de Sao Paulo and curated the International Literary Festival of Paraty (Flip) in 2017 and 2018. Currently she is the director of the Mário de Andrade Library.

Aguiar is the biographer of the Brazilian novelist, Jorge Amado. She won the Premio Jabuti for her 2018 book Jorge Amado: a biography.

References

External links
 Interview with Joselia Aguiar at Asymptote Journal
 Articles by Joselia Aguiar at Revista Pesquisa FAPESP

1978 births
Living people
Brazilian biographers
People from Salvador, Bahia
21st-century Brazilian women writers
21st-century Brazilian writers